The Cornwall Court Fire was a building fire incident in Hong Kong. It began in a nightclub and karaoke bar on the morning of Sunday 10 August 2008, taking the lives of four people, including two firefighters, and injuring a further 55 people.

Incident 
The fire broke out at 09:20, in the nightclub on the mezzanine floor, and quickly engulfed the entire building, according to a preliminary investigation by firefighters. It was upgraded to a No. 4 alarm at 10:23 and a No. 5 at 12:16. More than 200 firefighters and 40 appliances from across Kowloon were dispatched to deal with the blaze.
Many trapped residents were rescued. Cornwall Court is a 15-storey building on Nathan Road in Mong Kok, built in 1962. Its lower floors are occupied by a nightclub and shops while the upper floors are residential.  The fire caused the complete closure of Nathan Road and the evacuation of residents from nearby buildings.

Victims 

Two firefighters from Mong Kok Fire Station, Senior Fireman Siu Wing-fong, 46 years old with 24 years' experience, and Fireman Chan Siu-lung, 25 years old with one year of service, died from smoke inhalation on the top floor of the building while trying to reach trapped residents. Survivors reported that the two officers had given them their oxygen breathing apparatus even while continuing to carry the heavy cylinders.

One of the two civilian victims was a 77-year-old woman, on the ninth floor, and the other was a female staff member at the nightclub, surnamed Man and aged 39, who had been asleep with colleagues. Her burned body was found in the nightclub after the fire was extinguished.

Aftermath 
The fire was declared extinguished at 15:13, but the building remained closed pending an investigation into the cause of the fire. Residents were provided with temporary shelter in Mong Kok Community Centre, although some refused to leave their homes.

The southbound side of Nathan Road was reopened by evening, the pedestrian walk outside Cornwall Court was blocked till 12 August.

See also
 Garley Building Fire

References

External links 

 Inferno heroes mourned (The Standard)
 Mong Kok inferno kills 4, injures 55 (SCMP)

Fires in Hong Kong
2008 in Hong Kong
2008 fires in Asia